David Fess Thornton (December 14, 1924 – March 13, 2008) was an American attorney and politician who served as a member of the Virginia Senate and House of Delegates. A Republican, he was defeated for reelection by Buzz Emick in 1975.

References

External links 
 

1924 births
2008 deaths
Republican Party Virginia state senators
20th-century American politicians